Chantal Demming (born February 5, 1978 in Baarn, Utrecht, Netherlands) is a Dutch actress.

Biography
Chantal Demming was the youngest of three children and started at an early age to sing and act. During her high school years in Hilversum she joined the theater group Ons Genoegen, although she was at 16 actually too young. After having followed studies in psychology she auditioned at the Lucas Borkel Acteursschool (formerly Het Collectief) in Amsterdam, where she was accepted. In 2009 she graduated with the play Driesprong, written and directed by Helmert Woudenberg.

She played leading roles in Two hearts, one pulse, Vals alarm, and had a major role in Lilith and a few other short films. In 2010 she starred in the play Fallen Angels by Noël Coward with the theater company Sloof & Co. After her role in Lilith, Stephan Brenninkmeijer selected her for the lead role of Stella in his feature film Caged, which was released in 2011.

Filmography
 2011 Caged - Stella
 2010 Wij willen meer - afl. 1, Jacqueline
 2009 Helder - huiselijk geweld (Teleac) - lead
 2008 Two Hearts One Pulse - lead
 2008 Het leven uit een dag - Eva
 2006 Dennis P. - colleague

References

External links
 
 

1978 births
Living people
21st-century Dutch actresses
People from Baarn